The Army of the Czech Republic (AČR), also known as the Czech Army, is the military service responsible for the defence of the Czech Republic in compliance with international obligations and treaties on collective defence. It is also set to support peacekeeping, rescue and humanitarian operations both within the national territory and abroad. Armed Forces consist of the General Staff, the Land Forces, the Air Force and support units.

From 1954 to 1989, the extensive Czechoslovak People's Army (about 200,000) formed one of the pillars of the Warsaw Pact military alliance. After the dissolution of Czechoslovakia, the Czech Republic is completing a major reorganisation and reduction of the armed forces, which intensified after the Czech Republic joined NATO on 12 March 1999.

As defined by the Czech Law No. 219/1999 Coll., the Armed Forces of the Czech Republic are the military forces of the Czech Republic. They consist of the Army of the Czech Republic, the Military Office of the President of the Republic and the Castle Guard.

History

Czech lands 

Military history of the Czech people dates back to the Middle Ages and the creation of Duchy of Bohemia and Kingdom of Bohemia. During the Hussite Wars, Jan Žižka became a military leader of such skill and eminence that the Hussite legacy became an important and lasting part of the Czech military traditions.

Official military names since 1918: 

1918–1950 - Czechoslovak Armed Forces (this official name was given to the Czechoslovak Army on March 19, 1920 on the basis of the Armed Forces Act)

1950–1954 - Czechoslovak Army

1954–1989 - Czechoslovak People's Army

1990–1992 - Czechoslovak Army

since 1993 - Army of the Czech Republic (ACR)

Czechoslovakia 

The Czechoslovak Armed Forces were originally formed on 30 June 1918 when 6,000 members of the Czechoslovak Legion in France, which had been established in 1914, took oath and received a battle banner in Darney, France, thus preceding the official declaration of Czechoslovak independence by four months. There were also 50 000 legion soldiers in Russia at that time. The military achievements of the Czechoslovak legions on the French, Italian and especially Russian front became one of the main arguments that the Czechoslovak pro-independence leaders, especially for T. G. Masaryk in America,  could use to gain the support for the country's independence by the Allies of World War I.

In 1938, servicemen of the Czechoslovak Army and the State Defense Guard fought in an undeclared border war against the German-backed Sudetendeutsches Freikorps as well as Polish and Hungarian paramilitary forces. As a result of the Munich Agreement, areas heavily populated by ethnic German speaking people were incorporated into the Third Reich and military aged men living there were subject to being drafted into the Wehrmacht. In 1939, after the Slovak State proclaimed it's independence and the remainder of Carpathian Ruthenia was occupied and annexed by Hungary, the German occupation of the Czech Lands followed and the Protectorate of Bohemia and Moravia was proclaimed after the negotiations with Emil Hácha. The Protectorate's government possessed its own armed force, the Government Army (6,500 men), tasked with public security and rearguard duties. On the other side of the conflict, a number of Czechoslovak units and formations served with the Polish Army (Czechoslovak Legion), the French Army, the Royal Air Force, the British Army (the 1st Czechoslovak Armoured Brigade), and the Red Army (I Corps). Four Czech and Slovak-manned RAF squadrons were transferred to Czechoslovak control in late 1945.

From 1954 until 1989, the Army was known as the Czechoslovak People's Army (ČSLA). Although the ČSLA, as formed in 1945, included both Soviet- and British-equipped/trained expatriate troops, the "Western" soldiers had been purged from the ČSLA after 1948 when the communists took power. The ČSLA offered no resistance to the invasion mounted by the Soviets in 1968 in reaction to the "Prague Spring", and was extensively reorganized by the Soviets following the re-imposition of communist rule in Prague.

Of the approximately 201,000 personnel on active duty in the ČSLA in 1987, about 145,000, or about 72 percent, served in the ground forces (commonly referred to as the army). About 100,000 of these were conscripts. There were two military districts, Western and Eastern. A 1989 listing of forces shows two Czechoslovak armies in the west, the 1st Army at Příbram with one tank division and three motor rifle divisions, the 4th Army at Písek with two tank divisions and two motor rifle divisions. In the Eastern Military District, there were two tank divisions, the 13th and 14th, with a supervisory headquarters at Trenčín in the Slovak part of the country.

During the Cold War, the ČSLA was equipped primarily with Soviet arms, although certain arms like the OT-64 SKOT armored personnel carrier, the L-29 Delfín and L-39 Albatros aircraft, the P-27 Pancéřovka antitank rocket launcher, the vz. 58 assault rifle or the Uk vz. 59 machine gun were of Czechoslovak design. 

After the fall of communism during the Velvet Revolution in 1989, the Czechoslovak People's Army was renamed back to the Czechoslovak Army and was completely transformed as well .

After 1992 (dissolution of Czechoslovakia)

The Army of the Czech Republic was formed after the Czechoslovak Armed Forces split after the 31 December 1992 peaceful dissolution of Czechoslovakia. Czech forces stood at 90,000 in 1993. They were reduced to around 65,000 in 11 combat brigades and the Air Force in 1997, to 63,601 in 1999, and to 35,000 in 2005. At the same time, the forces were modernized and reoriented towards a defensive posture. In 2004, the army transformed itself into a fully professional organization and compulsory military service was abolished. The Army maintains an active reserve. 

The Czech Republic is a member of the United Nations and the Organization for Security and Co-operation in Europe.  In March 1999, the Czech Republic joined NATO. Since 1990, the ACR and the Czech Armed Forces have contributed to numerous peacekeeping and humanitarian operations, including IFOR, SFOR, and EUFOR Althea in Bosnia, Desert Shield/Desert Storm, Afghanistan, Kosovo, Albania, Turkey, Pakistan and with the Coalition forces in Iraq.

Current deployments (2019):

Lithuania: NATO Operation (NATO Enhanced Forward Presence) - 230 soldiers
Latvia: NATO Operation (NATO Enhanced Forward Presence) - 60 soldiers
Afghanistan: NATO Operation (Resolute Support Mission) - 390 soldiers
Estonia, Latvia and Lithuania: NATO Operation (Baltic Air Policing) - 95 soldiers, 5x Jas 39 Gripen
Kosovo: NATO Operation (KFOR) - 9 soldiers
Mali: EU military training mission (EUTM Mali) - 120 soldiers
Mali: UN peacekeeping mission (MINUSMA) - 5 soldiers
Somalia: EU Operation Atalanta (NAVFOR) - 3 soldiers
Sinai:  International peacekeeping force (MFO) - 18 soldiers
Iraq:  Military intervention against the Islamic State of Iraq and Syria (OIR) - 31 soldiers (air advisory team), 12 soldiers (chemical unit)
Mediterranean Sea: EU military operation (EU Navfor Med) - 5 soldiers
Bosnia and Herzegovina: Military deployment to oversee the military implementation of the Dayton Agreement (European Union Force Althea) - 2 soldiers
Golan Heights: UN peacekeeping mission (UNDOF) - 3 soldiers
DR Congo: UN peacekeeping mission (MONUC) - 2 military observers
Mali: UN peacekeeping mission (MINUSMA) - 2 military observers
Kosovo: UN peacekeeping mission (UNMIK) - 2 military observers
Central African Republic: UN peacekeeping mission (MINUSCA) - 3 military observers

Structure
Many of the duties of the President of the Czech Republic can be said to be ceremonial to one degree or another, especially since the President has relatively few powers independent of the will of the Prime Minister. One of those is the status as commander in chief of the military; no part of these duties can take place but through the assent of the Prime Minister. In matters of war, he is in every sense merely a figurehead, since the Constitution gives all substantive constitutional authority over the use of the armed forces to the Parliament. In fact, the only specific thing the constitution allows the President to do with respect to the military is to appoint its generalsbut even this must be done with the signature of the Prime Minister.

Structure of the Czech Armed Forces consists of two main parts and other commands:

 General Staff of Czech Armed Forces (Praha)
  Czech Land Forces (Praha)
  Czech Air Force (Praha)
Special Forces Command(Praha)
Cyber Forces Command (Brno)
Territorial Command (Tábor)
Training Command - Military Academy (Vyškov)

Active reserves
Active Reserve (in Czech Aktivní záloha) is a part of the otherwise professional Army of the Czech Republic. This service was created to allow the participation of citizens with a positive attitude to the military.

A volunteer needs either to have completed the compulsory military service (which ended in 2004) or to attend 6 week training. Then the reservists have to serve up to three weeks a year and can be called up to serve two weeks during a non-military crisis. They are not intended to serve abroad, but individuals may volunteer to do so. The Reserve presents itself on events like BAHNA, a military show.

Each of the active duty brigade or regiment have its own active reserve suborinate units that train with the same equipment as the professional soldiers and is part of the organisational structure usually as a 4th company in a battalion.
The Territorial Command is responsible for the active reserves and have direct control of the 14 infantry companies that belongs to regional military commands in each of the 13 regions and capital city Prague.

Equipment

The Army of the Czech Republic, to a large extent, currently uses equipment dating back to the times of the Warsaw Pact. During the Cold War, Czechoslovakia was a major supplier of tanks, armoured personnel carriers, military trucks and trainer aircraft – the bulk of military exports went to its Comecon partners. Replacement of aging or obsolete equipment, or making it at least compliant with NATO standards, is urgently required. Modernization plans include acquisition of new multi-role helicopters, transport aircraft, infantry fighting vehicles, air defence radars and missiles. If possible, the Czech Ministry of Defence selects products that are manufactured or co-produced in the Czech Republic. This includes firearms of the Česká zbrojovka Uherský Brod, namely the CZ 75 pistol, CZ Scorpion Evo 3 submachine gun, and CZ 805 BREN and BREN 2 assault rifles. Moreover, the Czech Army is equipped with about 3,000 T810 and T815 vehicles of various modifications produced by the Czech Tatra Trucks company. Tatra Defence Vehicle factory ensures licensed production of Pandur II and Titus armoured vehicles. Aircraft such as the Aero L-39 Albatros, Aero L-159 Alca and Let L-410 Turbolet have been produced domestically as well.

At the beginning of 2019, the Czech Ministry of Defence announced its modernization program, consisting of acquiring 210 new modern IFVs as a replacement for the aging BVP-2. MoD approached four manufacturers: BAE Systems (CV90), GDELS (ASCOD), Rheinmetall (Lynx) and PSM (Puma). The cost of the program is expected to exceed 50 billion CZK.

In May 2022 the Czech Ministry of Defence announced it will get 15 Leopards 2A4 from Germany as an exchange for Czech tanks that will be given to Ukraine to help defend against Russian invasion and will purchase up to 50 modern 2A7+ variants later.

Uniforms
Different types of Czech Army uniforms:

Commanding officers
Chief of the General Staff: Major General Karel Řehka
First Deputy Chief of the General Staff: Major General Ivo Střecha
Deputy Chief of the General Staff of the AČR-Chief of Staff: Lieutenant General Miroslav Hlaváč
Deputy Chief of the General Staff - Inspector of the AČR: Major General  Milan Schulc

Current and historic military ranks

See also
Czechoslovakian naval forces
Government Army

Citations

References

Further reading
 Stephane Lefebvre, 'The Army of the Czech Republic: A Status Report,' Journal of Slavic Military Studies, Vol. 8, No. 4, December 1995, pp. 718–751
 Tomáš Weiss, 'Fighting Wars or Controlling Crowds? The Case of the Czech Military Forces and the Possible Blurring of Police and Military Functions, Armed Forces & Society, Vol. 39, No. 3, pp. 450-466

External links

 Ministry of Defence of the Czech Republic
 Information Center about NATO
Training Command – Military Academy

Military of the Czech Republic
Permanent Structured Cooperation